The 2023 Georgia Bulldogs football team will represent the University of Georgia in the 2023 NCAA Division I FBS football season as a member of the Southeastern Conference. The team is expected to be led by Kirby Smart in his eighth year as Georgia's head coach.

Previous season

The Bulldogs finished the 2022 season with a record of 15–0 (8–0 in the SEC)—the only major team to finish the season with an undefeated record—and as consensus back-to-back national champions. Georgia entered the season as favorites to win the East Division and meet the LSU Tigers in the 2022 SEC Championship Game. Georgia finished the regular season with a 12–0 record with three wins against Top 25-ranked teams–and met Tigers for the SEC Championship. Georgia would win 50–30. The following day, final College Football Playoff (CFP) standings were unveiled. No. 1 ranked Georgia would meet No. 4 ranked Ohio State for the 2022 Peach Bowl, defeating the Buckeyes 42–41 to meet No. 3 ranked TCU for the College Football Playoff National Championship. In the College Football Playoff National Championship, the Bulldogs defeated the Horned Frogs, 65–7, to capture Georgia's second National Championship and to repeat as back-to-back champions. The victory over TCU gave Georgia their fourth national championship in football.

The team finished the 2022 season with a final ranking of No. 1 in both the AP and Coaches' Polls.

Offseason

Team departures

Transfer portal

Outgoing transfers
Ten Georgia Bulldogs players via NCAA Transfer Portal during or after the 2022 season.

Incoming transfers
Over the off-season, Georgia added three players via transfer portal. According to 247 Sports, Georgia had the No. 40 ranked transfer class in the country.

Returning starters

Recruiting class

Georgia signed 26 players in the class of 2023. The Bulldogs' recruiting class ranks No. 2 in the 247Sports and Rivals rankings. 19 signees were ranked in the ESPN 300 top prospect list. Alabama also signed walk-ons during national signing period.

 

 
 
 
 
 
 
 

 
 
  
  
  

 

 
 

*= 247Sports Composite rating; ratings are out of 1.00. (five stars= 1.00–.98, four stars= .97–.90, three stars= .80–.89, two stars= .79–.70, no stars= <70)
†= Despite being rated as a four and five star recruit by ESPN, On3.com, Rivals.com and 247Sports.com, TBD received a four-five star 247Sports Composite rating.
Δ= Left the Georgia program following signing but prior to the 2023 season.

2023 Overall class rankings

2024 recruiting class
 
  
 
 
 
 
 
 
 
 
 

2024 Overall class rankings

Walk-ons

NFL draft

Preseason

Spring game

The Bulldogs are scheduled to hold spring practices in March and April 2023 with the Georgia football spring game, "G-Day" to take place in Athens, GA on April 2023.

Award watch lists
Listed in the order that they were released

SEC media days
The 2023 SEC Media days were held on July 2023 at TBD. The Preseason Polls were released July 2023. Each team had their head coach available to talk to the media at the event. Coverage of the event was televised on SEC Network and ESPN.

Preseason All-SEC teams and All-American honors

Media
First Team

Second Team

Third Team

Source:

Coaches
First Team

Second Team

Third Team

Source:

Personnel

Coaching staff

 Football Support Staff

Eric Black - Director of Football Creative – Football 
Mike Cavan - Director of Football Administration 
Austin Chambers - Assistant Director of Player Development 
Jay Chapman - Director of Football Management 
David Cooper - Director of Recruiting Relations
Anna Courson - Football Operations Assistant 
Chandler Eldridge - Co-Director of Football Creative – Design 
Hunter Parker - Football Operations Assistant 
Bryant Gantt - Director of Player Support and Operations 
Matt Godwin - Player Personnel Coordinator 
Christina Harris - Director of Recruiting Administration 
Hailey Hughes - Football Operations Coordinator 
Ann Hunt - Administrative Assistant to Head Coach 
Jonas Jennings - Director of Player Development 
Angela Kirkpatrick - On Campus Recruiting Coordinator 
Jeremy Klawsky - Director of Football Technology 
Collier Madaleno - Director of Football Performance Nutrition 
John Meshad - Director of Equipment Operations 
Chad Morehead - Co-Director of Football Creative Design 
Neyland Raper - Assistant Director of Football Operations & Recruiting 
Logen Reed - Assistant Recruiting Coordinator 
Maurice Sims - Associate Director of Strength & Conditioning
Juwan Taylor - Player Development Assistant
Meaghan Turcotte - Assistant Director of Football Performance Nutrition
Tersoo Uhaa - Assistant Strength & Conditioning Coach
Gage Whitten - Director of Football Equipment and Apparel

Graduate assistants

 Garrett Murphy - Defensive Assistant
 Adam Ray - Special Teams Assistant 
 Jacob Russell - Offensive Assistant
 Rashawn Scott - Offensive assistant

Analysts
 Kirk Benedict
 Buster Faulkner
 Davis Merritt
 Rob Muschamp
 Montgomery VanGorder

Roster

Depth Chart

True Freshman

Injury report

Schedule

Game summaries

Statistics

Team

Individual leaders

Defense

Key: POS: Position, SOLO: Solo Tackles, AST: Assisted Tackles, TOT: Total Tackles, TFL: Tackles-for-loss, SACK: Quarterback Sacks, INT: Interceptions, BU: Passes Broken Up, PD: Passes Defended, QBH: Quarterback Hits, FR: Fumbles Recovered, FF: Forced Fumbles, BLK: Kicks or Punts Blocked, SAF: Safeties, TD : Touchdown

Special teams

Scoring
Georgia vs Non-Conference Opponents

Georgia vs SEC Opponents

Georgia vs All Opponents

Awards and SEC honors

Postseason

Media affiliates

Radio
Athens	- WNGC-FM (106.1), WRFC-AM (960), WTSH-FM (107.1)
Atlanta - WSB-AM (750) and WSBB-FM	(95.5) 
Nationwide (ESPN Radio, Dish Network, Sirius XM, Varsity Network and iHeartRadio)

TV
CBS Family – WANF (CBS), CBS Sports Network 
ESPN/ABC Family – WSB-TV (ABC), ABC, ESPN, ESPN2, ESPNU, ESPN+, SEC Network
FOX Family – Fox 5 Atlanta (FOX), FOX/FS1, FSN
NBC Family – WXIA-TV/WATL (NBC), NBC Sports, NBCSN
PBS - WGTV/WABE-TV
Peachtree TV - WPCH-TV
Univision - WUVG-DT (Spanish) 
Telemundo - WKTB-CD (Spanish)

TV ratings

All totals via Sports Media Watch. Streaming numbers not included. † - Data not available.

Rankings

References

Georgia
Georgia Bulldogs football seasons
Georgia Bulldogs football